Sulu köfte is a Turkish stew or thick soup (çorba) with köfte. It consists of meatballs usually made with minced beef, mixed with rice or bulgur, onion and spices and boiled in their own gravy, with tomato sauce, olive oil and Turkish red pepper paste.

A similar dish is called ekşili köfte or terbiyeli köfte, when made with egg-lemon (terbiye) sauce.

See also 
 Analı kızlı soup
 Harput meatballs
 Hochzeitssuppe
 Smyrna meatballs
 Yuvarlak
 Tabriz meatballs
 List of meatball dishes
 List of soups
 List of stews

Notes and references 

Turkish soups
Kofta